Kappa Pi International Art Honor Society, founded in 1911 at the University of Kentucky in Lexington, Kentucky, is an International Collegiate Art Honorary Fraternity. It is open to any student who has talent for or supports visual art. Kappa Pi has 360 collegiate chapters across the United States and Internationally.

Membership in Kappa Pi is divided into six classes: Active, Alumni, Sponsor, Faculty, Associate, Honorary, Patron and Life. Active or members are students who are currently matriculating  at a college, university or art school. Active members transfer to Alumni membership after they graduate. Associate, Patron, Faculty, Sponsor and Honorary membership can be bestowed under guidelines established by the International Constitution. Life Membership is Bestowed to member who makes a donation to the Kappa Pi International Scholarship Endowment.

The fraternity has local and international levels of governance. The most fundamental local unit is the collegiate chapter chartered at a college or university. An Executive Council, elected by an International Assembly at each International Conference, governs the international organization.

Kappa Pi has six identifying symbols, including a membership pin; the colors purple and gold; a coat of arms; an honor cord; and an official flower, the Purple Iris.

History

Founding and Alpha chapter 
Kappa Pi was founded in 1911 as an art club by students of the University of Kentucky in Lexington, Kentucky with the purpose of uniting artists who care about art and its role in life. This fraternity bonds conscientious artists together to form a unit which is influential in the art department as well as the community. Its founding members were W.C. Halbert, O. P. Gerhard, H. C. Williams, William Baughn, and F. C. Mueller. By 1914 the art club had grown into a fully functioning fraternity with a roll of six active members, ten pledges, one faculty member and one member urbe (now Associate). In 1915, according to The Kentuckian Yearbook, the fraternity adopted as its publication The Quill and Inkhorn, as its flower the Pansy, and as its colors lavender and old gold. In the following year the roster of the Alpha chapter grew to 13 active members and the first honorary members, Dr. Alexander St Clair Mackenzie and H.C. Norwood. Included in the chapter roll was the first appearance of the National Chapter Roll, listing four active chapters and two inactive chapters.

National expansion  

Kappa Pi began its national expansion in 1914 with the establishment of the Beta chapter at Centre College in Danville, Kentucky, Gamma chapter at Columbia University in New York City, New York, Delta chapter at Vanderbilt University in  Nashville, Tennessee, Epsilon chapter at Purdue University in West Lafayette, Indiana, and Phi chapter at Ohio State University in Columbus, Ohio. At the time of the publishing of the first National Chapter Roll in 1916, both the Delta and Epsilon chapters had gone inactive. The fraternity continued to see growth in the 1910s with the chartering of Zeta chapter at the University of Tennessee in Knoxville, Tennessee. Kappa Pi's first appearance was in the Miscellaneous Fraternities section of the 9th volume of Baird's Manual of American College Fraternities in 1920. At the time of publication it listed its colors as Purple and Gold, as well as the first five chapters.

International expansion 
The first International chapter of Kappa Pi was established in the Philippines in 1963. Another international chapter was chartered in Mexico.

Centennial and beyond

Membership 
The fiscal year for Kappa Pi is from September 1 to May 31 of any year. Initiates in the fall will, of course, receive more benefits than those being initiated in the late spring. Initiations can be held at any time during the fiscal year, at the discretion of the university art department and chapter sponsors. Kappa Pi publications (The Sketch Pad in the fall and The Sketchbook in the spring) will be sent to all active members, initiates, alumni and associate members upon payment of annual dues. Faculty Sponsors, Honorary Members and Patrons receive complimentary copies of the publications each year.

Active 
Active membership is composed of those matriculates of the colleges, universities and art schools having chapters of Kappa Pi, who have been regularly elected to membership in the Fraternity, and who have been duly initiated into membership according to the Ritual and Laws of the Fraternity.

Minimum requirements for consideration are:
 completion of twelve semester hours, or its equivalent, of art with a B average in these art subjects, or
 one year of professional work in some field of art.

Chapters may raise these minimum requirements to meet local conditions. An academic average of a C is recommended. Admission to the Active chapter is by majority vote of all active members.

Alumni 
Alumni members are Graduates of an Active Collegiate chapter.

Sponsor 
Sponsors are members who do not go through the ritual of the fraternity. Sponsor Members will have no voting power outside their Institutional chapter.

Faculty 
Faculty Members, in addition to Chapter Sponsors, who are interested in art, will be invited by the local chapter to affiliate on the basis of payment of International dues with no initiation fee.

Associate 
Associate members are supporters of the arts and of Kappa Pi. They are recognized for their support of the arts for the chapter, school, or community. They pay or their chapter may pay the regular initiation fee and annual international dues thereafter. Associate members have no voting power.

Honorary 
Honorary Members are members who have achieved outstanding recognition in the visual arts. They are proposed for membership through any active Collegiate chapter.

Patron 
Patron Membership is granted to those who contribute generously in the field of art through gifts, endowments, and art scholarships which enrich the community and/or institutions near which a Collegiate chapter is located.

Life 
Life Membership is open to any member in the above categories who makes a contribution to the International Scholarship Endowment.

Local Organization

Collegiate chapters 

The Executive Council has the power to grant charters to new chapters and to withdraw any charter at its discretion. A two-thirds vote is required to grant a charter, and a unanimous vote is required for a withdrawal of a charter. Each chapter is chartered under the name of the institution where it is located, and will also be designated by Greek letters which will be bestowed in accordance with its date of founding in regular sequence, as ALPHA, BETA, GAMMA; and when doubling of letters shall be required, ALPHA ALPHA, ALPHA BETA, etc., are used.

Chapter By-Laws 
The international office does require that by-laws be written by individual chapters. Each chapter is unique and could conceivably need different governing laws as determined by the international bylaws. Each chapter should identify its own methods for selecting members. Some chapters alter the academic requirements to a higher standard than the international level, or may adjust membership status to suit their needs. At no point can the bylaws be less than the standards determined by the international office. Because of this, the vast majority of chapters operate under the blanket bylaws of the fraternity. This ensures that they are performing up to our level, and also offers a structure to use as guidelines. If significant changes are made to the by-laws provided by the fraternity, it is necessary to send a copy to the international office for executive approval.

Many chapters use by-laws to expand their chapters' executive officers, and to expand their rituals and traditions. The by-laws of the Eta Iota chapter at South Carolina State University in Orangeburg, SC state an official day to observe Founders' Day and the chapter's Charter Day. It also spelled out a level of membership, Probationary, where members learn the history of Kappa Pi before becoming Active Members. chapter by-laws may also include insignia and symbols not adopted at the International level to include (but not limited to) hand signs, chapter logos, chapter hymns and chants.

Chapter Meetings 
Some chapters meet once a month, while others may meet every week. Some chapters help out at monthly art department exhibitions and other department functions, sponsor museum trips, host regional high school exhibitions, and assist with art programs at local elementary and high schools.

Chapter Traditions 
Chapter traditions differ greatly from chapter to chapter, and many of them go unwritten. Many chapters adopt their own philanthropy in the areas of art therapy, art education, community arts programs and projects, and art education advocacy. chapters also assign to each incoming member a big brother/sister to assist in the process of becoming a member of the chapter. One main tradition of chapters is the creation of a Pledge Paddle by the big brother/sister with the incoming member. A tradition in the case of historically black colleges and universities (HBCU) chapters is, after the incoming members complete becoming active members, an unveiling/probate show is produced to announce to the college/university community the members' newfound status in the fraternity.

International Organization

International Conference and International Assembly 
Kappa Pi holds an international conference every year at the inference of the International President and the Executive Council, or by the request of chapters by formal petition.

The first International conference of Kappa Pi, then only a national fraternity, was held in 1934 in Chicago, Illinois. The first Constitution was ratified with the following offices elected: President, First Vice-president, Second Vice-president, Secretary, Editor, Alumni Director, Director of Exhibits, Historian, and Librarian.

International Offices 
The International Officers of Kappa Pi are President, Vice-President, Secretary, Treasurer, Historian, Editor, and Parliamentarian (at the President Appointment).

Executive Council 
The Executive Council is composed of the International Officers as well as the immediate Past President. It has the power to grant chapter charters as well as revoke them.

International Assembly 
The International Assembly of Kappa Pi is composed of a member of all active chapters at the appointment of their chapter president and the assistance of the chapter's executive council. The International Assembly convenes at every International Conference to act in the best interest of the Fraternity as a whole. The Assembly has the power to overturn rulings of the executive council with a two-thirds majority vote.

National/International Presidents of Kappa Pi  

Current Executive Council 

Other Executive Offices

Kappa Pi International Scholarship Endowment

International Insignia and Symbols

Membership Pin 
The membership pin of Kappa Pi is a garnet paint palette with gold metal trim and gold Greek letters of Kappa and Pi. It was designed by Balfour Co. and Charles R. Morse, a member of the Zeta chapter of the University of Tennessee, and it was formally adopted in 1934 at the first National Conference.

Colors 
The official colors of Kappa Pi are purple and gold. The original colors of lavender and old gold were adopted by the Alpha chapter in 1911, but purple and gold were officially adopted at the first National Conference in 1934. Purple is used to represent sincerity, and gold is used to represent truth.

Flower 
The Purple Iris is the official flower of Kappa Pi; it was adopted in 1934 at the first National Conference. It is used to represent excellence. Prior to the first National Conference, the Kappa Pi flower was the Pansy.

Coat of Arms 
The shield of Kappa Pi is divided into three parts by a combination of dividers in the head of a T-square. The top part is colored red and the bottom part blue. Around the shield is a wide white or silver border on which is charged in the upper left hand corner a sphinx. In the upper right is a four-leafed flower, while draped around the bottom is a link chain fastened at the end with a five-pointed star and chained in the center with a lock.

In the center of the shield is the top of an Ionian column supporting a lamp of knowledge.

The crest consists of the conventionalized crest wreath, upon which rests a palette with three brushes inserted into it. The mantling is gracefully draped around this.

The stroll ribbon beneath the escutcheon carries the Greek name Kappa Pi in upper and lower case Greek letters.

The shield stands for protection. The three divisions of the shield stand for the active chapter, the alumnae, and school affiliation. The dividers stand for equality and have a further connotation in that as they describe a true and complete circle, they stand for friendship.

The Coat of Arms was registered with the U. S. Patent Office in 1972.

Honor Cord 
The Kappa Pi Honor Cord is presented to all active members upon graduation from an active collegiate chapter.

The design of the cord is two separate - three tiers spiral, two purple and one gold, with gold tassels.

Seal of Kappa Pi 
The Seal of Kappa Pi is a metallic purple circular seal with gold writing. The center bears the coat of arms of the fraternity and is surrounded by the full name of the fraternity.

The Seal is present on all Kappa Pi membership shingles.

Publications

The Sketchbook 
The Sketchbook is the official magazine of Kappa Pi. It is a yearly magazine published each spring that highlights the achievements of the active collegiate chapter, newly inducted members, honorary member inductions and new chapter charters.

The Sketchbook began publishing in 1932; its first Editor-in-Chief was Marie B. Ryan.

Sketchpad 
The Sketch Pad is the office newsletter of Kappa Pi.

The Quill and Inkhorn 
Prior to the first National Conference in 1935, the publication of Kappa Pi was The Quill and Inkhorn.

Chapters

References

Fraternities and sororities in the United States
Student organizations established in 1911
Honor societies
1911 establishments in Kentucky